The light middleweight class in the boxing at the 1964 Summer Olympics competition was the fourth-heaviest class.  Light middleweights were limited to those boxers weighing less than 71 kilograms. 25 boxers from 25 nations competed.

Medalists

Results

References

Sources

L